The Institute of Electronics Engineers of the Philippines (IECEP, formerly the Institute of Electronics and Communication Engineers of the Philippines) is a Professional Regulation Commission recognized organization of Professional Electronics Engineers (PECE), Electronics Engineers (ECE) and Electronics Technicians (ECT) in the Philippines.It is a non-stock and non-profit organization with  50,000 members inside and outside of the country. The IECEP was organized in 1950.

See also 
 Institute of Computer Engineers of the Philippines
 Electronics engineering

External links
https://myiecep.net/
 https://arslearningportal.files.wordpress.com/2015/09/3-about-iecep-and-its-history.pdf

Professional associations based in the Philippines
1950 establishments in the Philippines